SMS Posen was one of four battleships in the , the first dreadnoughts built for the German Imperial Navy (Kaiserliche Marine). The ship was laid down at the Germaniawerft shipyard in Kiel on 11 June 1907, launched on 12 December 1908, and commissioned into the High Seas Fleet on 31 May 1910. She was equipped with a main battery of twelve  guns in six twin turrets in an unusual hexagonal arrangement.

The ship served with her three sister ships for the majority of World War I. She saw extensive service in the North Sea, where she took part in several fleet sorties. These culminated in the Battle of Jutland on 31 May – 1 June 1916, where Posen was heavily engaged in night-fighting against British light forces. In the confusion, the ship accidentally rammed the light cruiser , which suffered serious damage and was scuttled later in the night.

The ship also conducted several deployments to the Baltic Sea against the Russian Navy. In the first of these, Posen supported a German naval assault in the Battle of the Gulf of Riga. The ship was sent back to the Baltic in 1918 to support the White Finns in the Finnish Civil War. At the end of the war, Posen remained in Germany while the majority of the fleet was interned in Scapa Flow. In 1919, following the scuttling of the German fleet in Scapa Flow, she was ceded to the British as a replacement for the ships that had been sunk. She was then sent to ship-breakers in the Netherlands and scrapped in 1922.

Description 

German designers initially considered ships equipped with  secondary guns, but erroneous reports in early 1904 that the British s would be equipped with a secondary battery of  guns prompted them to consider an even more powerful ship armed with an all-big-gun armament consisting of eight  guns. Over the next two years, the design was refined into a larger vessel with twelve of the guns, by which time Britain had launched the all-big-gun battleship .

She displaced  with a standard load, and  fully laden. The ship had a crew of 40 officers and 968 enlisted men. Posen retained three-shafted triple expansion engines with twelve coal-fired water-tube boilers instead of more advanced turbine engines. This type of machinery was chosen at the request of both Admiral Alfred von Tirpitz and the Navy's construction department; the latter stated in 1905 that the "use of turbines in heavy warships does not recommend itself." This decision was based solely on cost: at the time, Parsons held a monopoly on steam turbines and required a 1 million gold mark royalty fee for every turbine engine. German firms were not ready to begin production of turbines on a large scale until 1910.

Posen carried a main battery of twelve  SK L/45 guns in an unusual hexagonal configuration. Her secondary armament consisted of twelve  SK L/45 guns and sixteen  SK L/45 guns, all of which were mounted in casemates. Later in her career, two of the 8.8 cm guns were replaced with high-angle Flak mountings of the same caliber for defense against aircraft. The ship was also armed with six  submerged torpedo tubes. One tube was mounted in the bow, another in the stern, and two on each broadside, on either ends of the torpedo bulkhead.

Service history 

She was laid down on 11 June 1907 at the Germaniawerft shipyard in Kiel. As with her sister , construction proceeded under absolute secrecy; detachments of soldiers guarded the shipyard and also guarded contractors that supplied building materials, such as Krupp. The ship was launched a year and a half later, on 12 December 1908. Wilhelm August Hans von Waldow-Reitzenstein gave a speech at her launching, and Posen was christened by Johanna von Radolin, the wife of Hugo Fürst von Radolin, a German diplomat who hailed from the ship's namesake province. Initial trials were conducted through April 1910, followed by final fitting-out in May. The ship was commissioned into the fleet on 31 May. Sea trials were conducted afterward and completed by 27 August. In total, her construction cost the German government 36,920,000 marks.

After completing her trials in August 1910, Posen left Kiel for Wilhelmshaven, where she arrived on 7 September. As the German Imperial Navy had chronic shortages of trained sailors, many of the crew were then assigned to other ships. These crewmembers were replaced with personnel from the old pre-dreadnought battleship , which was decommissioned on 20 September. After their commissioning, all four Nassau-class ships served as a unit, II Division of I Battle Squadron, with Posen as the flagship.

Posen participated in several training exercises with the rest of the fleet before the outbreak of war. In late 1910 the fleet conducted a training cruise into the Baltic Sea. The following year the fleet conducted maneuvers in May; the annual summer cruise to Norway followed in July. The fleet participated in another round of fleet exercises in the Baltic in September, followed by another set at the end of the year. The next year followed a similar pattern, though the summer cruise to Norway was interrupted by the Agadir crisis; as a result, the summer cruise only went into the Baltic. The September exercises were conducted off Helgoland in the North Sea; another winter cruise into the Baltic followed at the end of the year. The training schedule returned to normal for 1913 and 1914, and the summer cruises again went to Norway. For the 1914 cruise, the fleet departed for Norwegian waters on 14 July, some two weeks after the assassination of Archduke Franz Ferdinand in Sarajevo. The probability of war cut the cruise short; Posen and the rest of the fleet were back in Wilhelmshaven by 29 July.

World War I 

At midnight on 4 August, the United Kingdom declared war on Germany. Posen and the rest of the fleet conducted several advances into the North Sea to support Rear Admiral Franz von Hipper's I Scouting Group battlecruisers. The battlecruisers raided British coastal towns in an attempt to lure out portions of the Grand Fleet where they could be destroyed by the High Seas Fleet. The first such operation was the raid on Scarborough, Hartlepool and Whitby on 15–16 December 1914. On the evening of 15 December, the German battle fleet of 12 dreadnoughts—including Posen and her three sisters—and eight pre-dreadnoughts came to within  of an isolated squadron of six British battleships. Skirmishes between the rival destroyer screens in the darkness convinced the German fleet commander, Admiral Friedrich von Ingenohl, that he was faced with the Grand Fleet, now deployed in its battle formation. Under orders from Kaiser Wilhelm II to avoid risking the fleet unnecessarily, von Ingenohl broke off the engagement and turned the battlefleet back toward Germany.

Battle of the Gulf of Riga 

In August 1915, a special unit from the German fleet attempted to clear the Russian-held Gulf of Riga in order to assist the German Army, which was planning an assault on Riga. To do so, the German planners intended to drive off or destroy the Russian naval forces in the Gulf, which included the pre-dreadnought battleship  and some smaller gunboats and destroyers. The German battle fleet was accompanied by several mine-warfare vessels. These ships were tasked with clearing Russian minefields and laying a series of their own minefields in the northern entrance to the gulf, to prevent Russian naval reinforcements from reaching the area. The eight battleships were to provide cover for the forces engaging the Russian flotilla. The first attempt on 8 August was unsuccessful, as it had taken too long to clear the Russian minefields to allow the minelayer  to lay a minefield of her own.

On 16 August, Posen and Nassau led a second attempt to breach the defenses of the gulf, with Posen as Admiral Schmidt's flagship. The two dreadnoughts were accompanied by 4 light cruisers and 31 torpedo boats. On the first day of the assault the Germans broke through the Russian forces, but two German light craft—the minesweeper  and the destroyer —were sunk. Sivuch was sunk that day and Korietz was severely damaged; the ship managed to limp away but had to be scuttled the following day. On the 17th, Posen and Nassau engaged Slava at long range; they scored three hits on the Russian ship and forced her to return to port. By 19 August, the Russian minefields had been cleared and the flotilla entered the Gulf. Reports of Allied submarines in the area prompted the Germans to call off the operation the following day. Admiral Hipper later remarked, "To keep valuable ships for a considerable time in a limited area in which enemy submarines were increasingly active, with the corresponding risk of damage and loss, was to indulge in a gamble out of all proportion to the advantage to be derived from the occupation of the Gulf before the capture of Riga from the land side." In fact, the battlecruiser Moltke had been torpedoed that morning. On 21 August, Schmidt had his flag hauled down from Posen and disbanded the special unit.

Return to the North Sea 

By the end of August Posen and the rest of the High Seas Fleet had returned to their anchorages in the North Sea. The next operation conducted was a sweep into the North Sea on 11–12 September, though it ended without any action. Another fleet sortie followed on 23–24 October without encountering any British forces. On 4 March 1916, Posen, Nassau, Westfalen, and Von der Tann steamed out to the Amrumbank to receive the auxiliary cruiser , which was returning from a raiding mission.

Another uneventful advance into the North Sea took place on 21–22 April. A bombardment mission followed two days later; Posen joined the battleship support for Hipper's battlecruisers while they attacked Yarmouth and Lowestoft on 24–25 April. During this operation, the battlecruiser Seydlitz was damaged by a British mine and had to return to port prematurely. Due to the poor visibility, the operation was soon called off, leaving the British fleet no time to intercept the raiders.

Battle of Jutland 

Admiral Reinhard Scheer, who had succeeded Admirals von Ingenohl and Hugo von Pohl as the fleet commander, immediately planned another attack on the British coast. The damage to Seydlitz and condenser trouble on several of the III Battle Squadron dreadnoughts delayed the plan until the end of May. The German battlefleet departed the Jade at 03:30 on 31 May. Posen was assigned to II Division of I Battle Squadron as the flagship of Rear Admiral W. Engelhardt. Posen was the first ship in the division, ahead of her three sisters. II Division was the last unit of dreadnoughts in the fleet; they were followed by only the elderly pre-dreadnoughts of II Battle Squadron.

Between 17:48 and 17:52, Posen and ten other German battleships engaged the British 2nd Light Cruiser Squadron, though the range and poor visibility prevented effective fire. Shortly thereafter, two British destroyers— and —came under intense fire from the German line. Posen fired at Nestor with both her main battery and secondary guns. At 18:35, Nestor exploded and sank under the combined fire of eight battleships. By 20:15, the German fleet had faced the Grand Fleet for a second time and was forced to turn away; in doing so, the order of the German line was reversed. Posen was now the fourth ship in the line, astern of her three sisters.

At around 21:20, Posen and her sister ships were engaged by the battlecruisers of the 3rd Battlecruiser Squadron.

At about 00:30, the leading units of the German line encountered British destroyers and cruisers. A violent firefight at close range ensued; the leading German battleships, including Posen, opened fire on several British warships. In the confusion, the light cruiser  passed through the German line directly in front of Posen and was rammed. Posen was undamaged, but both of Elbings engine rooms were flooded and the ship came to a halt. Two and a half hours later, Elbing spotted several approaching British destroyers, and her captain gave the order to scuttle the ship.

Shortly before 01:00, the German line engaged a flotilla of British destroyers. Fortune quickly sank under fire from Posen and several other battleships, but not before firing two torpedoes which Posen had to evade.

Despite the ferocity of the night fighting, the High Seas Fleet punched through the British destroyer forces and reached Horns Reef by 04:00 on 1 June. The German fleet reached Wilhelmshaven a few hours later, where Posen and several other battleships from I Battle Squadron took up defensive positions in the outer roadstead. Over the course of the battle, the ship had fired fifty-three 28 cm shells, sixty-four 15 cm rounds, and thirty-two 8.8 cm shells. The ship and her crew emerged from the battle completely unscathed by enemy fire.

Beginning in June 1917, Wilhelm von Krosigk served as the ship's commanding officer; he held this position until the end of the war in November 1918.

Expedition to Finland 

In February 1918, the German navy decided to send an expedition to Finland to support German army units to be deployed there. The Finns were engaged in a civil war; the White Finns sought a conservative government free from the influence of the newly created Soviet Union, while the Red Guards preferred Soviet-style communism. On 23 February, two of Posens sister ships—Westfalen and Rheinland—were assigned as the core of the Sonderverband Ostsee (Special Unit Baltic Sea). The two ships embarked the 14th Jäger Battalion. They departed for Åland on the following morning. Åland was to be a forward operating base, from which the port of Hanko would be secured. From Hanko, the German expedition would assault the capital of Helsingfors. Negotiations ensued, which resulted in the landing of the German troops on Åland on 7 March; Westfalen then returned to Danzig, where Posen was stationed.

On 31 March Posen and Westfalen left Danzig; the ships arrived at Russarö, which was the outer defense for Hanko, by 3 April. The German army quickly took the port. The task force then proceeded to Helsingfors; on 11 April the ship passed into the harbor at Helsingfors and landed the soldiers. This included a detachment from the ship which was landed two days later on 13 April. During the operation, Posens crew suffered four men killed and twelve wounded. From 18 to 20 April, Posen assisted with the efforts to free Rheinland, which had been grounded. Two days later, Posen struck a sunken wreck in Helsingfors harbor, which caused minor damage. On 30 April the ship was detached from the Sonderverband Ostsee. The ship returned to Germany, reaching Kiel by 3 May, where she entered drydock. Repair work lasted until 5 May.

Later actions in the North Sea 
On 11 August 1918, Posen, Westfalen, and  sortied from Wilhelmshaven to support torpedo boats on patrol off Terschelling. On 2 October, Posen moved out into the outer roadsteads of the Jade to provide cover for the returning U-boats of the Flanders Flotilla. Posen was to have taken part in the last fleet operation of the war, planned for 30 October. The operation was intended to inflict as much damage as possible on the British navy, in order to retain a better bargaining position for Germany, whatever the cost to the fleet. War-weary sailors mutinied, which led to the operation being canceled. In an attempt to suppress the spread of mutinous sentiments, Admiral Hipper ordered the fleet dispersed. Posen and the other ships of I Battle Squadron were sent out into the roadstead on 3 November, then returned to Wilhelmshaven on 6 November.

Fate 
On 11 November 1918, the Armistice took effect; according to its terms, eleven battleships and five battlecruisers were to be interned in Scapa Flow for the duration of negotiations for the peace treaty. Posen was not among the ships interned, and she was instead decommissioned on 16 December. The ships in Scapa Flow were scuttled by their crews on 21 June 1919 to prevent them from being seized by the Allies. As a result, Posen and the other battleships that remained in Germany were seized as replacements for the ships that had been lost. On 5 November, Posen was stricken from the German navy list to be handed over to Great Britain. The ship was transferred on 13 May 1920; on 1 November 1920, she was driven ashore at Hawkcraig, Fife, Scotland. The British subsequently sold Posen to ship-breakers in the Netherlands. She was broken up in Dordrecht in 1922.

Notes

Footnotes

Citations

References

Further reading
 

Nassau-class battleships
Ships built in Kiel
1908 ships
World War I battleships of Germany
Maritime incidents in 1920
Shipwrecks of Scotland